Mardi Gras refers to events of the Carnival celebrations, beginning on or after Epiphany, and culminating on the day before Ash Wednesday.

Mardi Gras may also refer to:

Festivals
Mardi Gras in Mobile, annual Carnival festival held in Mobile, Alabama
New Orleans Mardi Gras, annual Carnival festival held in New Orleans, Louisiana
Mardi Gras throws, strings of beads, doubloons, cups, and other trinkets typical of the New Orleans Mardi Gras
Sydney Gay and Lesbian Mardi Gras, at one stage temporarily the Sydney Mardi Gras, a gay pride parade held annually in Sydney, Australia

Business and transportation
 three ships bearing the name
Mardi Gras, a line of napkins (and formerly, paper towels) made by Georgia-Pacific

Arts, entertainment, and media

Film
Mardi Gras (1943 film), a short
Mardi Gras (1958 film), a musical starring Pat Boone
Mardi Gras: Spring Break, a 2011 American film starring Carmen Electra

Music
Mardi Gras (album), a 1972 album by Creedence Clearwater Revival
Mardi Gras (EP), a 2010 EP by Cowboy Mouth
Mardi Gras (music group), a New York City based rock'n'roll band successful in the early 1970s in Europe
"Mardi Gras", a 1977 song by Gino Vanelli from A Pauper in Paradise
"Take Me to the Mardi Gras", a 1973 song by Paul Simon, covered by Bob James

People
Mardi Gras Indians, African-American Carnival revelers in New Orleans, Louisiana, who dress up as Native Americans
Edgar Pearce, (born 1937/38), the "Mardi Gra bomber", responsible for a terror campaign in London during the mid-1990s

See also
MardiGrass, a cannabis-law reform festival held in the town of Nimbin, in north east New South Wales, Australia
Mardi (disambiguation)